Lakhanwal Khas or simply Lakhanwal is a village in the district of Gujrat, Pakistan. Lakhanwal Khas is formed by the merger of two closely related villages Lakhanwal Kalan and Lakhanwal Khurd. Whereas Lankhanwal Kalan is located in the west, Lakhanwal Khurd is located in the east. These two villages are separated by Tanda Road and are collectively known as Lakhanwal.

References

Villages in Gujrat District